Emmet is a ghost town in the rural locality of Isisford in the Longreach Region of Queensland, Australia. Today, the town has a population of two.

History 

Emmet was once a prosperous town built around the Emmet railway station on the Blackall and Yaraka Branch railway.

Attractions 
The site now contains a picnic shelter and a small museum that is housed in the former railway station building.  Its relative proximity to the Idalia National Park makes it a popular stopping off point for tourists.

References

External links 

 

Longreach Region
Isisford, Queensland